Sanborn is a city in O'Brien County, Iowa, United States. The population was 1,392 at the time of the 2020 census.

History
Sanborn got its start in the year 1871, following construction of the Chicago, Milwaukee & St. Paul Railway through that territory. It was named for George W. Sanborn, the railroad president. Sanborn was incorporated as a town in 1880.

Geography
Sanborn is located at  (43.183112, -95.656666).

Climate

Demographics

2010 census
As of the census of 2010, there were 1,404 people, 574 households, and 356 families living in the city. The racial makeup of the city was 97.6% White, 0.5% African American, 0.1% Native American, 0.1% Asian, 1.5% from other races, and 0.1% from two or more races. Hispanic or Latino of any race were 2.3% of the population.

There were 574 households, of which 28.0% had children under the age of 18 living with them, 52.3% were married couples living together, 6.3% had a female householder with no husband present, 3.5% had a male householder with no wife present, and 38.0% were non-families. 34.7% of all households were made up of individuals, and 21.8% had someone living alone who was 65 years of age or older. The average household size was 2.33 and the average family size was 3.01.

The median age in the city was 44.2 years. 24.4% of residents were under the age of 18; 7.1% were between the ages of 18 and 24; 19.1% were from 25 to 44; 23.3% were from 45 to 64; and 26.1% were 65 years of age or older. The gender makeup of the city was 47.5% male and 52.5% female.

2000 census
As of the census of 2000, there were 1,353 people, 558 households, and 372 families living in the city. The racial makeup of the city was 99.41% White, 0.07% African American, 0.07% Native American, 0.15% from other races, and 0.30% from two or more races. Hispanic or Latino of any race were 0.44% of the population.

There were 558 households, out of which 23.8% had children under the age of 18 living with them, 61.6% were married couples living together, 3.9% had a female householder with no husband present, and 33.3% were non-families. 30.8% of all households were made up of individuals, and 18.8% had someone living alone who was 65 years of age or older. The average household size was 2.28 and the average family size was 2.84.

20.7% were under the age of 18, 6.8% from 18 to 24, 20.3% from 25 to 44, 21.4% from 45 to 64, and 30.9% were 65 years of age or older. The median age was 46 years. For every 100 females, there were 86.9 males. For every 100 females age 18 and over, there were 82.8 males.

The median income for a household in the city was $34,250, and the median income for a family was $42,500. Males had a median income of $31,792 versus $19,750 for females. The per capita income for the city was $18,189. About 2.8% of families and 4.8% of the population were below the poverty line, including 4.7% of those under age 18 and 3.2% of those age 65 or over.

Education
Sanborn is served by the Hartley–Melvin–Sanborn Community School District, which formed on July 1, 1991, with the merger of the Hartley–Melvin and Sanborn districts. Sanborn is home to the Hartley–Melvin–Sanborn Middle School.

Sanborn is home to the Sanborn Christian School, a private school that serves grades preschool through eighth grade.

Notable people

 William D. Boies, politician 
 Neva Boyd, sociologist 
 Will Kirk Kaynor, politician
 Otto Puhlman, politician

References

Cities in O'Brien County, Iowa
Cities in Iowa